Port Glasgow Athletic Juniors Football Club were a series of Scottish association football clubs which played at Junior level from 1895 to 1939. Although there are references to a PGA Juniors from 1893, this was probably the senior PGA's third XI. As was usual at the time, an amateur club, Port Glasgow Victoria, became linked to the Senior club in 1903 and was renamed PGA Juniors, this was to be the club that existed until the outbreak of World War Two in 1939.

They shared the ground at Clune Park, Port Glasgow with the Senior side Port Glasgow Athletic. When the latter disbanded in 1912 the Juniors played on at the ground until 1917. The site was then cleared and housing for the local shipyards were put up in its place. To play on, the Port shared with Greenock club Morton at Cappielow Park until 1921. They finally built a ground at Garvel Park, Greenock.

By the late 1930s, the club were desperate to move back to their home town, but because of a lack of available space this proved impossible. There was a scheme to redevelop the Bay area of the town, but insurance costs were prohibitive and the club never returned to Port Glasgow. The club made the decision to fold in June 1939. After the Second World War Junior football returned in the shape of Port Glasgow Juniors. Garvel Park at the time was within an estate, but the whole area had since been built over and is now a dockyard.

Port Glasgow Athletic Juniors reached the final of the Scottish Junior Cup once and won the Scottish Junior Football League on a record five occasions – 1909–10, 1910–11, 1913–14, 1929–30 and 1937–38.

Defunct football clubs in Scotland
Association football clubs established in 1895
Association football clubs disestablished in 1939
Football in Inverclyde
1895 establishments in Scotland
1939 disestablishments in Scotland
Port Glasgow
Scottish Junior Football Association clubs